This article lists various water polo records and statistics in relation to the Italy men's national water polo team at the Summer Olympics.

The Italy men's national water polo team has participated in 21 of 27 official men's water polo tournaments.

Abbreviations

Team statistics

Comprehensive results by tournament
Notes:
 Results of Olympic qualification tournaments are not included. Numbers refer to the final placing of each team at the respective Games.
 At the 1904 Summer Olympics, a water polo tournament was contested, but only American contestants participated. Currently the International Olympic Committee (IOC) and the International Swimming Federation (FINA) consider water polo event as part of unofficial program in 1904.
 Last updated: 5 May 2021.

Legend

  – Champions
  – Runners-up
  – Third place
  – Fourth place
  – The nation did not participate in the Games
  – Qualified for forthcoming tournament
  – Hosts

Number of appearances
Last updated: 27 July 2021.

Legend
 Year* – As host team

Best finishes
Last updated: 27 July 2021.

Legend
 Year* – As host team

Finishes in the top four
Last updated: 5 May 2021.

Legend
 Year* – As host team

Medal table
Last updated: 5 May 2021.

Player statistics

Multiple appearances

The following table is pre-sorted by number of Olympic appearances (in descending order), year of the last Olympic appearance (in ascending order), year of the first Olympic appearance (in ascending order), date of birth (in ascending order), name of the player (in ascending order), respectively.

Multiple medalists

The following table is pre-sorted by total number of Olympic medals (in descending order), number of Olympic gold medals (in descending order), number of Olympic silver medals (in descending order), year of receiving the last Olympic medal (in ascending order), year of receiving the first Olympic medal (in ascending order), name of the player (in ascending order), respectively.

Top goalscorers

The following table is pre-sorted by number of total goals (in descending order), year of the last Olympic appearance (in ascending order), year of the first Olympic appearance (in ascending order), name of the player (in ascending order), respectively.

Goalkeepers

The following table is pre-sorted by edition of the Olympics (in ascending order), cap number or name of the goalkeeper (in ascending order), respectively.

Last updated: 27 July 2021.

Legend and abbreviation
  – Hosts
 Eff % – Save efficiency (Saves / Shots)

Sources:
 Official Reports (PDF): 1996 (pp. 62–66, 70, 72–73);
 Official Results Books (PDF): 2000 (pp. 47, 52, 55, 64, 68–69, 74, 76), 2004 (pp. 211–212), 2008 (pp. 205–206), 2012 (pp. 484–485), 2016 (pp. 123–124).

Top sprinters
The following table is pre-sorted by number of total sprints won (in descending order), year of the last Olympic appearance (in ascending order), year of the first Olympic appearance (in ascending order), name of the sprinter (in ascending order), respectively.

* Number of sprinters (30+ sprints won, since 2000): 1
 Number of sprinters (20–29 sprints won, since 2000): 0
 Number of sprinters (10–19 sprints won, since 2000): 4
 Number of sprinters (5–9 sprints won, since 2000): 0
 Last updated: 15 May 2021.

Legend and abbreviation
  – Hosts
 Eff % – Efficiency (Sprints won / Sprints contested)
 AUS – Australia
 ITA – Italy

Source:
 Official Results Books (PDF): 2000 (pp. 47, 52, 55, 64, 68–69, 74, 76), 2004 (pp. 211–212), 2008 (pp. 205–206), 2012 (pp. 484–485), 2016 (pp. 123–124).

Coach statistics

Medals as coach and player
The following table is pre-sorted by total number of Olympic medals (in descending order), number of Olympic gold medals (in descending order), number of Olympic silver medals (in descending order), year of winning the last Olympic medal (in ascending order), year of winning the first Olympic medal (in ascending order), name of the person (in ascending order), respectively. Last updated: 5 May 2021.

As a water polo player, Ratko Rudić won a silver medal for Yugoslavia at the 1980 Summer Olympics. He led Italy men's national water polo team to win two Olympic medals in 1992 and 1996.

Italian Alessandro Campagna won a gold medal at the Barcelona Olympics in 1992, coached by Ratko Rudić. As a head coach, he guided Italy men's national team to two medals in 2012 and 2016.

Legend
 Year* – As host team

Olympic champions

1948 Summer Olympics

1960 Summer Olympics

1992 Summer Olympics

See also
 Italy women's Olympic water polo team records and statistics
 List of men's Olympic water polo tournament records and statistics
 Lists of Olympic water polo records and statistics
 Italy at the Olympics

Notes

References

Sources

ISHOF

External links
 Italy men's national water polo team – Official website
 Olympic water polo – Official website

.Olympics, Men
Olympic water polo team records and statistics